During the 1971–72 season the Los Angeles Lakers won their first National Basketball Association (NBA) title since moving to Los Angeles. The Lakers defeated the New York Knicks in five games to win the title, after going 69–13 during the regular-season, a record that stood for 24 seasons until the 1995–96 Chicago Bulls went 72–10. During the regular season, they would also go on an NBA record 33-game winning streak. The team went on to win 81 regular season and playoff games overall, a record that would stand alone for 14 years until the Boston Celtics matched it in 1986.  Widely regarded as one of the greatest basketball teams of all time, the 1971–72 Lakers were named as one of the Top 10 Teams in NBA History in 1996.

The Lakers defeated the Chicago Bulls in 4 games in the Western Conference Semifinals. The team then defeated the Milwaukee Bucks in a 6-game Western Conference Finals. The Lakers then got to the NBA Finals once again for the 14th time in league history. They faced the New York Knicks in a rematch of the 1970 NBA Finals. The Knicks were defeated in 5 games, the Lakers claimed their sixth title in team history and the first since 1954. Wilt Chamberlain won Finals MVP.

Offseason
 Traded a 1971 2nd round draft pick to the Cincinnati Royals for guard Flynn Robinson.
 Hired Bill Sharman as the new head coach to replace Joe Mullaney.
 Traded a 1972 2nd round draft pick to the Portland Trail Blazers for center Leroy Ellis.
 Claimed forward John Q. Trapp off waivers from the Houston Rockets.

NBA Draft

Roster

Regular season
Since moving to Los Angeles, the Lakers were repeatedly foiled by the Boston Celtics in their attempts to capture an NBA title. The Lakers lost the championship to them six times in eight years. In 1970, with the aging Celtics out of title contention, the Lakers lost in the NBA finals to the New York Knicks. In 1971, after losing Jerry West to a season-ending injury in February, they lost in the Western Conference finals to the powerful Milwaukee Bucks.

Going into the 1971–72 season, many experts thought the chance at a championship had passed for this aging team. Star players Wilt Chamberlain, Elgin Baylor, and Jerry West were all in their 30s, and had all missed significant time due to injuries in the prior two seasons.  The defending champion Milwaukee Bucks, led by superstar Kareem Abdul-Jabbar, appeared to be starting a new NBA dynasty.  But new coach Bill Sharman still believed the Lakers had the talent to contend. He introduced strict conditioning drills and implemented a running fast break-based offense. He re-tooled Wilt Chamberlain's game to focus on defense, rebounding, and jump-starting the fast break with quick outlet passes to guards Jerry West and Gail Goodrich. The only casualty of this system was the aging Baylor, who could not physically handle the up-tempo practices and offense and retired 9 games into the season. He was replaced at small forward by Jim McMillian who played at a near all-star level.

Shortly thereafter, the Lakers strung together a record 33-game win streak. The streak ended on January 9, 1972, against the Milwaukee Bucks.  The Lakers and Bucks then staged a season-long race for the league's best record, with the Lakers setting a then NBA record with 69 wins (the Bucks had the second-best record at 63–19).

Season standings

z – clinched division title
y – clinched division title
x – clinched playoff spot

Record vs. opponents

Game logs

Regular season

|- align="center" bgcolor="#bbffbb"
| 1
| Fri, Oct 15, 1971
| @ Detroit
| 132–103
| Wilt Chamberlain (26)
| Wilt Chamberlain (15)
| Jerry West (9)
| Cobo Arena10,613
| 1–0
|- align="center" bgcolor="#bbffbb"
| 2
| October 16, 1971
| @ New York
| W 119–104
| McMillian (28)
| Chamberlain (19)
| West (6)
| Madison Square Garden19,296
| 2–0
|- align="center" bgcolor="#bbffbb"
| 3
| Tue, Oct 19, 1971
| @ Buffalo
| 123–106
| Gail Goodrich (24)
| Wilt Chamberlain (12)
| Gail Goodrich (6)
| Buffalo Memorial Auditorium9,127
| 3–0
|- align="center" bgcolor="#bbffbb"
| 4
| October 20, 1971
| @ Atlanta
| W 126–104
| McMillian (39)
| Chamberlain (25)
| McMillian (6)
| Alexander Memorial Coliseum5,543
| 4–0
|- align="center" bgcolor="#ffcccc"
| 5
| October 22, 1971
| Chicago
| L 106–113
| Goodrich (26)
| Chamberlain (18)
| Hairston (6)
| The Forum15,086
| 4–1
|- align="center" bgcolor="#bbffbb"
| 6
| Sun, Oct 24, 1971
| @ Houston
| 113–103
| Gail Goodrich (31)
| Chamberlain, Hairston (13)
| Gail Goodrich (6)
| Hofheinz Pavilion4,061
| 5–1
|- align="center" bgcolor="#bbffbb"
| 7
| Fri, Oct 29, 1971
| Cincinnati
| 107–119
| Gail Goodrich (31)
| Wilt Chamberlain (32)
| Jim McMillian (7)
| The Forum12,442
| 6–1
|- align="center" bgcolor="#ffcccc"
| 8
| Sat, Oct 30, 1971
| @ Seattle
| 106–115
| Flynn Robinson (28)
| Happy Hairston (13)
| Gail Goodrich (7)
| Seattle Center Coliseum13,138
| 6–2
|- align="center" bgcolor="#ffcccc"
| 9
| Sun, Oct 31, 1971
| Golden State
| 109–105
| Gail Goodrich (38)
| Wilt Chamberlain (24)
| Wilt Chamberlain (6)
| The Forum11,303
| 6–3

|- align="center" bgcolor="#bbffbb"
| 10
| November 5, 1971
| Baltimore
| W 110–106
| Goodrich (31)
| Chamberlain (25)
| Chamberlain, West (6)
| The Forum11,168
| 7–3
|- align="center" bgcolor="#bbffbb"
| 11
| Sat, Nov 6, 1971
| @ Golden State 
| 105–89
| Jerry West (28)
| Wilt Chamberlain (17)
| Jerry West (8)
| Oakland-Alameda County Coliseum Arena10,625
| 8–3
|- align="center" bgcolor="#bbffbb"
| 12
| November 7, 1971
| New York
| W 103–96
| West (29)
| Chamberlain (22)
| West (8)
| The Forum15,397
| 9–3
|- align="center" bgcolor="#bbffbb"
| 13
| November 9, 1971
| @ Chicago
| W 122–109
| McMillian (28)
| Chamberlain (20)
| West (13)
| Chicago Stadium9,082
| 10–3
|- align="center" bgcolor="#bbffbb"
| 14
| Wed, Nov 10, 1971
| @ Philadelphia
| 143–103
| Gail Goodrich (34)
| Wilt Chamberlain (14)
| Jerry West (10)
| Spectrum9,503
| 11–3
|- align="center" bgcolor="#bbffbb"
| 15
| Fri, Nov 12, 1971
| Seattle
| 107–115
| Jerry West (28)
| Wilt Chamberlain (22)
| Jerry West (8)
| The Forum16,550
| 12–3
|- align="center" bgcolor="#bbffbb"
| 16
| Sat, Nov 13, 1971
| @ Portland
| 130–108
| LeRoy Ellis (27)
| Wilt Chamberlain (13)
| Jerry West (11)
| Memorial Coliseum9,990
| 13–3
|- align="center" bgcolor="#bbffbb"
| 17
| November 14, 1971
| Boston
| W 128–115
| Goodrich (36)
| Chamberlain (31)
| Chamberlain (10)
| The Forum17,505
| 14–3
|- align="center" bgcolor="#bbffbb"
| 18
| Tue, Nov 16, 1971
| Cleveland
| 90–108
| Jerry West (25)
| Wilt Chamberlain (15)
| Wilt Chamberlain (6)
| The Forum10,475
| 15–3
|- align="center" bgcolor="#bbffbb"
| 19
| Fri, Nov 19, 1971
| Houston
| 99–106
| Gail Goodrich (32)
| Wilt Chamberlain (23)
| Chamberlain, Goodrich, West (6)
| The Forum11,484
| 16–3
|- align="center" bgcolor="#bbffbb"
| 20
| November 21, 1971
| Milwaukee
| W 112–105
| Goodrich (27)
| Chamberlain (26)
| West (13)
| The Forum17,505
| 17–3
|- align="center" bgcolor="#bbffbb"
| 21
| Thu, Nov 25, 1971
| @ Seattle
| 139–115
| Jerry West (26)
| Wilt Chamberlain (15)
| Jerry West (13)
| Seattle Center Coliseum13,170
| 18–3
|- align="center" bgcolor="#bbffbb"
| 22
| Fri, Nov 26, 1971
| Detroit
| 113–132
| Wilt Chamberlain (31)
| Wilt Chamberlain (31)
| Jerry West (18)
| The Forum17,101
| 19–3
|- align="center" bgcolor="#bbffbb"
| 23
| Sun, Nov 28, 1971
| Seattle
| 111–138
| Jerry West (25)
| Wilt Chamberlain (26)
| Jerry West (8)
| The Forum15,544
| 20–3

|- align="center" bgcolor="#bbffbb"
| 24
| December 1, 1971
| @ Boston
| W 124–111
| West (45)
| Chamberlain (20)
| Chamberlain (6)
| Boston Garden8,584
| 21–3
|- align="center" bgcolor="#bbffbb"
| 25
| Fri, Dec 3, 1971
| @ Philadelphia
| 131–116
| Jim McMillian (41)
| Wilt Chamberlain (25)
| Jerry West (9)
| Spectrum14,923
| 22–3
|- align="center" bgcolor="#bbffbb"
| 26
| Sun, Dec 5, 1971
| Portland
| 107–123
| Hairston, West (20)
| Wilt Chamberlain (27)
| Jerry West (10)
| The Forum17,505
| 23–3
|- align="center" bgcolor="#bbffbb"
| 27
| Wed, Dec 8, 1971
| @ Houston
| 125–120
| Gail Goodrich (42)
| Happy Hairston (15)
| Jerry West (6)
| Hofheinz Pavilion9,346
| 24–3
|- align="center" bgcolor="#bbffbb"
| 28
| Thu, Dec 9, 1971
| @ Golden State
| 124–111
| Jerry West (38)
| Wilt Chamberlain (15)
| Jerry West (11)
| Oakland-Alameda County Coliseum Arena8,892
| 25–3
|- align="center" bgcolor="#bbffbb"
| 29
| Fri, Dec 10, 1971
| Phoenix
| 117–126 (OT)
| Gail Goodrich (32)
| Wilt Chamberlain (28)
| Jerry West (11)
| The Forum17,505
| 26–3
|- align="center" bgcolor="#bbffbb"
| 30
| December 12, 1971
| Atlanta
| W 104–95
| Gail Goodrich (32)
| Chamberlain (24)
| West (14)
| The Forum17,505
| 27–3
|- align="center" bgcolor="#bbffbb"
| 31
| Tue, Dec 14, 1971
| @ Portland
| 129–114
| Chamberlain, Goodrich (24)
| Wilt Chamberlain (18)
| Jerry West (15)
| Memorial Coliseum9,048
| 28–3
|- align="center" bgcolor="#bbffbb"
| 32
| Fri, Dec 17, 1971
| Golden State
| 99–129
| Gail Goodrich (25)
| Wilt Chamberlain (18)
| Jerry West (9)
| The Forum15,552
| 29–3
|- align="center" bgcolor="#bbffbb"
| 33
| Sat, Dec 18, 1971
| @ Phoenix
| 132–106
| Gail Goodrich (28)
| Wilt Chamberlain (16)
| Jerry West (7)
| Arizona Veterans Memorial Coliseum12,534
| 30–3
|- align="center" bgcolor="#bbffbb"
| 34
| Sun, Dec 19, 1971
| Philadelphia
| 132–154
| Wilt Chamberlain (32)
| Wilt Chamberlain (34)
| Jerry West (10)
| The Forum17,505
| 31–3
|- align="center" bgcolor="#bbffbb"
| 35
| Tue, Dec 21, 1971
| @ Buffalo
| 117–103
| Jerry West (33)
| Wilt Chamberlain (22)
| Jerry West (10)
| Buffalo Memorial Auditorium1,602
| 32–3
|- align="center" bgcolor="#bbffbb"
| 36
| December 22, 1971
| @ Baltimore
| W 127–120
| West (37)
| Hairston (17)
| West (9)
| Baltimore Civic Center8,468
| 33–3
|- align="center" bgcolor="#bbffbb"
| 37
| Sun, Dec 26, 1971
| Houston
| 115–137
| Jerry West (34)
| Happy Hairston (21)
| Jerry West (17)
| The Forum17,505
| 34–3
|- align="center" bgcolor="#bbffbb"
| 38
| Tue, Dec 28, 1971
| Buffalo
| 87–105
| Jerry West (24)
| Happy Hairston (14)
| Jerry West (8)
| The Forum17,505
| 35–3
|- align="center" bgcolor="#bbffbb"
| 39
| Thu, Dec 30, 1971
| @ Seattle
| 122–106
| Jim McMillian (34)
| Wilt Chamberlain (24)
| Jerry West (11)
| Seattle Center Coliseum13,106
| 36–3

|- align="center" bgcolor="#bbffbb"
| 40
| January 2, 1972
| Boston
| W 122–113
| Goodrich (40)
| Hairston (19)
| West (12)
| The Forum17,505
| 37–3
|- align="center" bgcolor="#bbffbb"
| 41
| Wed, Jan 5, 1972
| @ Cleveland
| 113–103
| Jim McMillian (29)
| Happy Hairston (19)
| Jerry West (14)
| Cleveland Arena11,178
| 38–3
|- align="center" bgcolor="#bbffbb"
| 42
| January 7, 1972
| @ Atlanta
| W 134–90
| Jim McMillian (26)
| Chamberlain, Hairston (14)
| West (13)
| Alexander Memorial Coliseum7,192
| 39–3
|- align="center" bgcolor="#ffcccc"
| 43
| January 9, 1972
| @ Milwaukee
| L 104–120
| West (20)
| Hairston (18)
| West (6)
| MECCA Arena10,746
| 39–4
|- align="center" bgcolor="#bbffbb"
| 44
| Tue, Jan 11, 1972
| @ Detroit
| 123–103
| Wilt Chamberlain (29)
| Wilt Chamberlain (18)
| Jerry West (9)
| Cobo Arena10,050
| 40–4
|- align="center" bgcolor="#ffcccc"
| 45
| Wed, Jan 12, 1972
| @ Cincinnati
| 107–108
| Wilt Chamberlain (24)
| Happy Hairston (23)
| Jerry West (7)
| Cincinnati Gardens5,231
| 40–5
|- align="center" bgcolor="#bbffbb"
| 46
| Fri, Jan 14, 1972
| @ Philadelphia
| 135–121
| Jerry West (30)
| Wilt Chamberlain (20)
| Jerry West (13)
| Spectrum12,919
| 41–5
|- align="center"
|colspan="9" bgcolor="#bbcaff"|All-Star Break
|- style="background:#cfc;"
|- bgcolor="#bbffbb"
|- align="center" bgcolor="#ffcccc"
| 47
| January 21, 1972
| New York
| L 101–104
| Chamberlain (28)
| Chamberlain (19)
| West (8)
| The Forum17,505
| 41–6
|- align="center" bgcolor="#ffcccc"
| 48
| Sat, Jan 22, 1972
| @ Phoenix
| 102–116
| Jerry West (26)
| Wilt Chamberlain (20)
| Jerry West (8)
| Arizona Veterans Memorial Coliseum12,534
| 41–7
|- align="center" bgcolor="#bbffbb"
| 49
| Tue, Jan 25, 1972
| Phoenix
| 119–129
| Gail Goodrich (33)
| Wilt Chamberlain (18)
| Jerry West (7)
| The Forum17,505
| 42–7
|- align="center" bgcolor="#bbffbb"
| 50
| Fri, Jan 28, 1972
| Houston
| 105–118
| Gail Goodrich (28)
| Chamberlain, Hairston (18)
| Jerry West (9)
| The Forum16,183
| 43–7
|- align="center" bgcolor="#bbffbb"
| 51
| Sun, Jan 30, 1972
| Portland
| 131–153
| Gail Goodrich (29)
| Wilt Chamberlain (24)
| Jerry West (14)
| The Forum17,007
| 44–7

|- align="center" bgcolor="#bbffbb"
| 52
| February 4, 1972
| Milwaukee
| W 118–105
| West (37)
| Chamberlain (25)
| West (13)
| The Forum17,505
| 45–7
|- align="center" bgcolor="#bbffbb"
| 53
| Sat, Feb 5, 1972
| @ Golden State
| 108–96
| Gail Goodrich (30)
| Wilt Chamberlain (22)
| Jerry West (14)
| Oakland-Alameda County Coliseum Arena13,502
| 46–7
|- align="center" bgcolor="#bbffbb"
| 54
| February 6, 1972
| Baltimore
| W 151–127
| Trapp (27)
| Hairston (13)
| West (10)
| The Forum17,103
| 47–7
|- align="center" bgcolor="#bbffbb"
| 55
| February 8, 1972
| @ New York
| W 107–102
| Goodrich (36)
| Chamberlain (20)
| West (7)
| Madison Square Garden19,588
| 48–7
|- align="center" bgcolor="#bbffbb"
| 56
| February 9, 1972
| @ Atlanta
| W 117–113
| West (31)
| Hairston (11)
| Goodrich, West (4)
| Alexander Memorial Coliseum7,192
| 49–7
|- align="center" bgcolor="#ffcccc"
| 57
| February 11, 1972
| @ Boston
| L 108–121
| West (25)
| McMillian (10)
| West (11)
| Boston Garden15,315
| 49–8
|- align="center" bgcolor="#bbffbb"
| 58
| February 13, 1972
| N Baltimore
| W 121–110
| McMillian (31)
| Hairston (20)
| West (11)
| Cole Field House14,239
| 50–8
|- align="center" bgcolor="#bbffbb"
| 59
| Tue, Feb 15, 1972
| Cincinnati
| 118–125
| Gail Goodrich (33)
| Wilt Chamberlain (19)
| Jerry West (13)
| The Forum15,161
| 51–8
|- align="center" bgcolor="#ffcccc"
| 60
| Wed, Feb 16, 1972
| @ Phoenix
| 109–110
| McMillian, West (26)
| Wilt Chamberlain (21)
| Jerry West (8)
| Arizona Veterans Memorial Coliseum12,534
| 51–9
|- align="center" bgcolor="#bbffbb"
| 61
| Fri, Feb 18, 1972
| Portland
| 114–125
| Gail Goodrich (34)
| Happy Hairston (19)
| Jerry West (10)
| The Forum15,357
| 52–9
|- align="center" bgcolor="#bbffbb"
| 62
| Sat, Feb 19, 1972
| @ Portland
| 115–94
| Happy Hairston (21)
| Wilt Chamberlain (19)
| Jerry West (12)
| Memorial Coliseum11,903
| 53–9
|- align="center" bgcolor="#bbffbb"
| 63
| February 20, 1972
| Boston
| W 132–113
| West (39)
| Chamberlain (30)
| West (9)
| The Forum17,505
| 54–9
|- align="center" bgcolor="#ffcccc"
| 64
| Tue, Feb 22, 1972
| Detroit
| 135–134 (OT)
| Jerry West (37)
| Wilt Chamberlain (21)
| Jerry West (12)
| The Forum14,245
| 54–10
|- align="center" bgcolor="#ffcccc"
| 65
| Wed, Feb 23, 1972
| N Houston
| 110–115
| Jerry West (36)
| Wilt Chamberlain (14)
| Goodrich, West (6)
| Heart O' Texas Fair Complex7,621
| 54–11
|- align="center" bgcolor="#bbffbb"
| 66
| Fri, Feb 25, 1972
| Cincinnati
| 88–109
| Gail Goodrich (25)
| Wilt Chamberlain (14)
| Jerry West (7)
| The Forum17,036
| 55–11
|- align="center" bgcolor="#bbffbb"
| 67
| February 27, 1972
| Chicago
| W 123–118 (OT)
| West (36)
| Chamberlain (23)
| West (12)
| The Forum17,505
| 56–11
|- align="center" bgcolor="#bbffbb"
| 68
| February 29, 1972
| @ New York
| W 114–111
| West (32)
| Chamberlain (19)
| West (7)
| Madison Square Garden19,588
| 57–11

|- align="center" bgcolor="#bbffbb"
| 69
| March 1, 1972
| N Milwaukee
| W 109–108
| West (28)
| Hairston (20)
| West (6)
| Wisconsin Field House9,227
| 58–11
|- align="center" bgcolor="#bbffbb"
| 70
| March 3, 1972
| Atlanta
| W 114–104
| Goodrich (33)
| Hairston (25)
| Chamberlain, West (7)
| The Forum17,282
| 59–11
|- align="center" bgcolor="#ffcccc"
| 71
| March 5, 1972
| Baltimore
| L 94–108
| West (25)
| Hairston (27)
| West (6)
| The Forum17,505
| 59–12
|- align="center" bgcolor="#bbffbb"
| 72
| Tue, Mar 7, 1972
| Philadelphia
| 97–114
| Gail Goodrich (25)
| Wilt Chamberlain (18)
| Jerry West (7)
| The Forum17,505
| 60–12
|- align="center" bgcolor="#bbffbb"
| 73
| Fri, Mar 10, 1972
| Cleveland
| 98–132
| Gail Goodrich (30)
| Wilt Chamberlain (18)
| Jerry West (8)
| The Forum14,861
| 61–12
|- align="center" bgcolor="#bbffbb"
| 74
| Sun, Mar 12, 1972
| Buffalo
| 102–141
| Hairston, McMillian (23)
| Wilt Chamberlain (17)
| Erickson, West (8)
| The Forum14,090
| 62–12
|- align="center" bgcolor="#bbffbb"
| 75
| Tue, Mar 14, 1972
| @ Detroit
| 129–116
| Jim McMillian (30)
| Wilt Chamberlain (14)
| Jerry West (14)
| Cobo Arena5,982
| 63–12
|- align="center" bgcolor="#bbffbb"
| 76
| Wed, Mar 15, 1972
| @ Cincinnati
| 121–116
| Jerry West (32)
| Wilt Chamberlain (24)
| Jerry West (16)
| Cincinnati Gardens5,516
| 64–12
|- align="center" bgcolor="#bbffbb"
| 77
| March 17, 1972
| Milwaukee
| W 123–107
| McMillian (27)
| Chamberlain (24)
| West (10)
| The Forum17,505
| 65–12
|- align="center" bgcolor="#bbffbb"
| 78
| Sun, Mar 19, 1972
| Golden State
| 99–162
| Gail Goodrich (30)
| Happy Hairston (20)
| Jerry West (13)
| The Forum17,505
| 66–12
|- align="center" bgcolor="#bbffbb"
| 79
| March 21, 1972
| @ Chicago
| W 109–104
| Goodrich (29)
| Chamberlain (29)
| West (11)
| Chicago Stadium17,729
| 67–12
|- align="center" bgcolor="#ffcccc"
| 80
| Wed, Mar 22, 1972
| @ Cleveland
| 120–124
| Goodrich, West (31)
| Wilt Chamberlain (19)
| Jerry West (12)
| Cleveland Arena10,819
| 67–13
|- align="center" bgcolor="#bbffbb"
| 81
| Fri, Mar 24, 1972
| Phoenix
| 110–112
| Gail Goodrich (36)
| Wilt Chamberlain (19)
| Jerry West (10)
| The Forum17,505
| 68–13
|- align="center" bgcolor="#bbffbb"
| 82
| Sun, Mar 26, 1972
| Seattle
| 98–124
| Gail Goodrich (24)
| Wilt Chamberlain (23)
| Jerry West (11)
| The Forum17,505
| 69–13

Playoffs

|- align="center" bgcolor="#ccffcc"
| 1
| March 28, 1972
| Chicago
| W 95–80
| Goodrich (32)
| Chamberlain, Hairston (17)
| West (10)
| The Forum17,505
| 1–0
|- align="center" bgcolor="#ccffcc"
| 2
| March 30, 1972
| Chicago
| W 131–124
| West (37)
| Chamberlain (21)
| West (11)
| The Forum17,505
| 2–0
|- align="center" bgcolor="#ccffcc"
| 3
| April 2, 1972
| @ Chicago
| W 108–101
| West (31)
| Chamberlain (14)
| West (9)
| Chicago Stadium17,805
| 3–0
|- align="center" bgcolor="#ccffcc"
| 4
| April 4, 1972
| @ Chicago
| W 108–97
| Goodrich (27)
| Chamberlain (31)
| West (10)
| Chicago Stadium18,847
| 4–0
|-

|- align="center" bgcolor="#ffcccc"
| 1
| April 9, 1972
| Milwaukee
| L 73–93
| Hairston (16)
| Chamberlain (24)
| West (6)
| The Forum17,505
| 0–1
|- align="center" bgcolor="#ccffcc"
| 2
| April 12, 1972
| Milwaukee
| W 135–134
| McMillian (42)
| Chamberlain (17)
| West (13)
| The Forum17,505
| 1–1
|- align="center" bgcolor="#ccffcc"
| 3
| April 14, 1972
| @ Milwaukee
| W 108–105
| Goodrich (30)
| Chamberlain (14)
| West (8)
| MECCA Arena10,746
| 2–1
|- align="center" bgcolor="#ffcccc"
| 4
| April 16, 1972
| @ Milwaukee
| L 88–114
| West (24)
| Chamberlain, Hairston (11)
| Chamberlain, West (4)
| MECCA Arena10,746
| 2–2
|- align="center" bgcolor="#ccffcc"
| 5
| April 18, 1972
| Milwaukee
| W 115–90
| McMillian (25)
| Chamberlain (26)
| West (10)
| The Forum17,505
| 3–2
|- align="center" bgcolor="#ccffcc"
| 6
| April 22, 1972
| @ Milwaukee
| W 104–100
| West (25)
| Chamberlain (24)
| West (9)
| MECCA Arena10,746
| 4–2
|-

|- align="center" bgcolor="#ffcccc"
| 1
| April 26, 1972
| New York
| L 92–114
| Goodrich (20)
| Chamberlain (19)
| West (7)
| The Forum17,505
| 0–1
|- align="center" bgcolor="#ccffcc"
| 2
| April 30, 1972
| New York
| W 106–92
| Goodrich (31)
| Chamberlain (24)
| West (13)
| The Forum17,505
| 1–1
|- align="center" bgcolor="#ccffcc"
| 3
| May 3, 1972
| @ New York
| W 107–96
| Chamberlain (26)
| Chamberlain, Hairston (20)
| West (8)
| Madison Square Garden19,588
| 2–1
|- align="center" bgcolor="#ccffcc"
| 4
| May 5, 1972
| @ New York
| W 116–111 (OT)
| West (28)
| Chamberlain (24)
| West (7)
| Madison Square Garden19,588
| 3–1
|- align="center" bgcolor="#ccffcc"
| 5
| May 7, 1972
| New York
| W 114–100
| Goodrich (25)
| Chamberlain (29)
| West (9)
| The Forum17,505
| 4–1
|-

Player statistics

Regular season

Playoffs

NBA Finals

The Los Angeles Lakers played against the New York Knicks in the NBA finals during the postseason.

Game 1
Although without Willis Reed because of his knee injury. Jerry Lucas scored 26 points but was only one of several Knicks who was red hot. Bill Bradley hit 11 of 12 shots from the field as New York shot 53 percent for the game. The team took advantage of a nearly perfect first half to jump to a good lead and won easily, 114–92. Early in the second half, the Forum crowd began filing out dejectedly. It looked like another Los Angeles fold in the Finals.

Game 2
Knicks forward Dave DeBusschere hurt his side and didn't play after the first half. Hairston scored 12 points in the second half, and Los Angeles evened the series with a 106–92 win.

Game 3
DeBusschere attempted to play in the first half and missed all six of his field-goal attempts. He was hurting and elected not to play in the second half. DeBusschere explained, "I didn't feel I was helping the team." The Lakers danced out to a 22-point lead and regained the home-court advantage with a 107–96 win.

Game 4
The game went into overtime, but at the end of regulation, Wilt Chamberlain picked up his fifth foul. In 13 NBA seasons, he had never fouled out of a game, a history he was immensely proud of but also one that usually led to him playing less aggressively when he was on the verge of getting a 6th foul. As the press waited for Wilt to take the floor and hurt the Lakers by reverting to a passive style, he instead came out in a shotblocking fury that propelled the Lakers to a 116–111 win. At three games to one, their lead now seemed insurmountable.

Game 5
The Lakers won their sixth NBA championship by the score of 114–100.  This was their first championship since moving to Los Angeles in 1960. Jerry West also won his first NBA championship after 12 years of waiting. Wilt Chamberlain scored 24 points and 29 rebounds and earned the NBA Finals MVP Award.

Award winners
 Bill Sharman, NBA Coach of the Year
 Jerry West, All-NBA First Team
 Jerry West, All-NBA Defensive First Team
 Wilt Chamberlain, All-NBA Defensive First Team
 Wilt Chamberlain, NBA Leader, Shooting Percentage (.649)

References

External links
 1971 Lakers on Database Basketball
 1971–72 Lakers on Basketball Reference

Los Angeles
Los Angeles Lakers seasons
NBA championship seasons
Western Conference (NBA) championship seasons
Los Angle
Los Angle